Richard Fred Chandler (born 1958/59) is a New Zealand-born billionaire businessman. He is chairman of the Clermont Group, a Singapore-based business group that invests in public and private companies across a range of industries, including energy, financial services, consumer, and healthcare. Chandler "has a reputation for buying struggling companies and successfully rebuilding them," according to Australian Broadcasting Corporation News. He also has been known to "take a business approach to philanthropy."

Early life
Born in New Zealand, Chandler is the son of beekeepers Robert and Marija Chandler, who launched and operated Chandler House, a department store in Hamilton, New Zealand. Chandler attended Auckland Grammar School.

Career
Chandler was formerly CEO of the Sovereign group of companies, in partnership with his brother, Christopher Chandler. Between 1986 and 2006, Sovereign invested in companies and governments in Asia, Africa, Latin America and Eastern Europe, and in industries including telecommunications, electric utilities, steel, oil and gas, banking and oil refining.

The brothers split their assets in 2007 with Richard Chandler creating Orient Global and the Clermont Group while Christopher Chandler starting Legatum Capital. Richard's investment style has been described as deep value investing, primarily in global emerging markets and especially in distress situations.

Orient Global changed its name to Richard Chandler Corporation in April 2010 before becoming the Chandler Corporation in 2013, and the Clermont Group in 2016. The company "is a long-term value investor that believes well-governed companies play a fundamental role in creating national prosperity," according to its website.

Richard Chandler's business ventures have been tinged with themes of contrarian investment, corporate governance and social responsibility, especially by investing in and managing companies with national socio-economic implications. He once told Institutional Investor, "We do have altruistic motives that some investors who are looking for a path of least resistance find hard to understand, but we don’t want to be defined by our corporate governance battles. We are value investors with a sense of responsibility, not activists."

The Chandler brothers were involved in a highly publicized incident in 2005. Sovereign sold its investment in South Korea's SK Corp., at the time South Korea's third-largest oil conglomerate, after the board refused to oust chairman and CEO Chey Tae Won. Chey had been convicted of accounting fraud for illegally trading stocks. Sovereign had invested in the company just after Chey's arrest, hoping to turn it around. Richard Chandler and his brother tried twice unsuccessfully to remove Chey and ultimately pulled out for ethical reasons. By that point they had improved the company and profited US$728 million.

In 2007 Richard Chandler launched a US$100 million education initiative in the developing world with the focus to build low-cost private education opportunities in India. Furthermore, he invested in a global chain of international K-12 schools called Nobel Education Network.

Multiple media outlets reported in 2012 that Chandler considered investing in the Tasmanian logging company, Gunns, but ultimately decided not to.

Yahoo Finance reported in June 2013 that Chandler's company acquired an 80% stake in Hoan My Medical Corporation, Vietnam's largest private hospital group. According to the article's author, the transaction "complements the healthcare businesses the Chandler Corporation owns and operates in Indonesia and the Philippines, positioning it to become a leading private healthcare provider in Asia."

Philanthropy 
In November 2017, Richard Chandler was invited to be a core partner in Co-Impact, a new global model for collaborative philanthropy and social change at scale. Other core partners include Bill and Melinda Gates, Jeff Skoll, Romesh and Kathy Wadhwani, and The Rockefeller Foundation.

Personal life
Chandler is married to Kady Leyau, a business woman, former model, actress, and VJ at Taiwan MTV.

References

External links 
 Chandler Family History
 Clermont

Year of birth missing (living people)
Living people
New Zealand businesspeople
New Zealand expatriates in Monaco
New Zealand investors
New Zealand billionaires
1950s births
New Zealand people of Croatian descent